Misquamicut is a census-designated place and fire district in southern Washington County, Rhode Island.  It is part of the town of Westerly and is a census-designated place. The population was listed as 390 in 2010.

Name
Misquamicut is a word in the Narragansett language or in another Algonquian language closely related to Narragansett. It can be derived from the roots mish 'red' + kwam 'fish' + k (plural) + -t 'at', meaning 'At the Place of the Red Fish,' that is, 'At the Salmon Place'.

History
The district was once known as Pleasant View. The land was purchased from Chief Sosoa of the Montauks in 1661. The name was changed from Pleasant View to Misquamicut in 1928. The area suffered a series of devastating hurricanes that wiped out beach homes, hotels, and other structures in 1938, 1944, and 1954. A portion of the oceanfront became Misquamicut State Beach in 1959.

It lies south of Misquamicut State Beach  and north of Winnapaug Pond, a source of Rhode Island quahogs (clams) and bay scallops. The first parcel of this property was purchased in 1920 from the Norwich and Westerly Railway by Julia and Harry Trefes. Subsequent purchases by them and their two sons eventually totaled . The property is still owned and operated by the Trefes family. This section of Misquamicut was originally called "Atlantic Beach Casino". It retains a carousel with antique band organ, kiddie rides, bumper cars, game room, and ice cream stand. More recently, mini-golf, go-karts, batting cage, water slides, gift shop, and more have been added.

Geography
According to the U.S. Census Bureau, Misquamicut has a total area of 1.25 mi2 (3.23 km2), of which 1.17 mi2 (3.04 km2) is land and 0.075 mi2 (0.19 km2), or 6.0%, is water.

Demographics

References

External links
Misquamicut Fire District

Census-designated places in Washington County, Rhode Island
Westerly, Rhode Island
Census-designated places in Rhode Island
Populated coastal places in Rhode Island
1661 establishments in Rhode Island